The Rhine-Ruhr metropolitan region is the largest metropolitan region in Germany, with over ten million inhabitants. The Rhine-Ruhr metropolitan region spreads from the Ruhr area (Dortmund-Bochum-Essen-Duisburg) in the north to the urban areas of the cities of Mönchengladbach, Düsseldorf (the state capital), Wuppertal, Leverkusen, Cologne (the region's largest and Germany's fourth largest city), and Bonn in the south. The location of the Rhine-Ruhr at the heart of the European Blue Banana makes it well connected to other major European cities and metropolitan areas such as the Randstad, the Flemish Diamond and the Frankfurt Rhine Main Region.

The metropolitan area is named after the Rhine and Ruhr rivers, which are the region's defining geographical features and historically its economic backbone.

Subdivisions
The largest cities in the Rhine-Ruhr area are Cologne, with over one million inhabitants, followed by Düsseldorf, Dortmund and Essen, each of which has slightly more than 575,250.

Many unofficial compositions of the Rhine-Ruhr area differ from one another, while the officially defined border of the metropolitan area itself comprises Hamm in the east, Mönchengladbach in the west, Bonn in the south, with the small city of Wesel as its northernmost point. The northern border is similar to that of the Ruhr Area.

This first unofficial table here characterizes the Rhine-Ruhr area as comprising three regions, which together constitute an area much larger than officially defined.

Eurostat's Urban Audit splits the Rhine-Ruhr region into six Larger Urban Zones (LUZ). Not one of these six Urban Zones comprises the cities of Remscheid and Solingen or the district of Rhein-Kreis Neuss.

Economy

Historically, most of the Ruhr area was for the most part characterized by heavy industry since the age of industrialisation in the late 19th and early 20th century. Since the Middle Ages, Cologne, Dortmund, and other cities were important regional trading cities, but during the 19th century the city of Düsseldorf grew to become the administrative center of the region and since 1945, its political capital.

Today, the Rhine-Ruhr metropolitan region accounts for roughly 15% of the GDP of the German economy, which would place it as the 2nd largest metropolitan area GDP in the European Union. Despite this size, the Rhine-Ruhr region as a whole often lacks international competitiveness because it lacks a unified presentation. Cities and urban areas within it often pursue separate investment policies against each other.

From within, Düsseldorf, Essen, and Cologne are by far the largest economic centers, with specialisation in financial/high tech and insurance/multi media services respectively. Other major economic centers are Bonn and Dortmund. The region is home to twelve Fortune Global 500 companies, among them E.ON AG (Essen), Deutsche Post AG (Bonn), Metro AG (Düsseldorf), Deutsche Telekom AG (Bonn), ThyssenKrupp AG, (Essen), RWE AG (Essen), Bayer AG (Leverkusen), Franz Haniel & Cie. GmbH (Duisburg), Evonik Industries (Essen), Hochtief AG, (Essen), and the Henkel Group, (Düsseldorf).

Climate

The Rhine-Ruhr area's climate is characterized by having the warmest winters in Germany, especially its western part at the Lower Rhine area. Classified by Köppen-Geiger climate classification to be oceanic (Cfb).

Transportation

Air
The area has four international commercial airports, and several smaller aerodromes for general aviation.

Road
The network of Autobahns in North Rhine-Westphalia is the most dense in all of Germany.

Public transport
The rail, S-Bahn, U-Bahn and bus companies are administered through a consortium of local and regional transport lines, the Verkehrsverbund Rhein-Ruhr. It offers a rapid transit system which interconnects all cities and their respective local buses, trams, U- and S-Bahn systems, partly under the umbrella of Deutsche Bahn. Their systems are highly integrated where even some subway lines continue from one city to the next (for example between Düsseldorf and Duisburg or Bochum and Herne, which is unique in Germany, as the city border is crossed underground). The region is divided into several urban zones and fares are paid according to the amount of urban areas (or zones) passed through. Tickets include door to door transportation with all forms covered in one ticket with the exception of high speed rail (which only stops in the major cities). Some excursions, theatre and opera tickets as well as museums offer free transportation from any point in the Rhine Ruhr area to the venue and return.

Waterways
Duisburg Inner Harbour (Duisport) and Dortmund Port are large industrial inland ports and serve as hubs along the Rhine and the German inland water transport system.

Tourism

Events

The region is host to numerous large events, comprising fun fairs and cultural events like the Cologne and Düsseldorf carnivals (carnival is however a public event in almost all cities and towns of the area), the Cologne Comedy Festival, Ruhrfestspiele Recklinghausen, and the RuhrTriennale, as well as Gamescom and other trade fairs at Koelnmesse—Cologne Trade Fair and Messe Düsseldorf; and Essen Motor Show in Essen. With a capacity of up to 20,000 people, the Lanxess Arena and Westfalenhallen are amongst the largest indoor arenas in Germany.

The region is home to a total of 13 Bundesliga football clubs, of which five are active in the season of 2017–18. The most successful among them are Borussia Dortmund, Borussia Mönchengladbach, 1. FC Köln, FC Schalke 04 and Bayer 04 Leverkusen. The Revierderby is the rivalry between Borussia Dortmund and Schalke 04, one of the most significant in German football. Westfalenstadion, the stadium of Borussia Dortmund, is the biggest stadium in Germany. The area had plans to bid for the 2032 Summer Olympics, before the IOC declared Brisbane to be the host.

Landmarks

Several tourist destinations within the region attract over 12 million tourists per year. Cologne Cathedral, Augustusburg and Falkenlust Palaces at Brühl and the Zollverein Coal Mine Industrial Complex at Essen are UNESCO World Heritage Sites. Other sights include Schloss Benrath in Düsseldorf and several anchor points of the European Route of Industrial Heritage.

Museums
NRW Forum, Kunstsammlung Nordrhein-Westfalen, Kunsthalle Düsseldorf, Museum Koenig, Museum Ludwig, Romano-Germanic Museum, Wallraf-Richartz Museum, Neanderthal Museum, Museum Folkwang, Museum Ostwall, Lehmbruck Museum, German Mining Museum and Deutsches Museum Bonn are some of the most famous examples.

Education
The Rhine-Ruhr metropolitan region is home to nine universities and over 30 partly postgraduate colleges, with a total of over 300.000 students. The largest and oldest university is the University of Cologne (Universität zu Köln), founded in 1388 AD. Other universities include:
 the Ruhr University Bochum,
 the University of Bonn,
 the German Sport University Cologne,
 the Dortmund University of Technology,
 the University of Duisburg-Essen,
 the University of Düsseldorf,
 the FernUniversität Hagen and
 the University of Wuppertal.

Municipalities

The following register lists all municipalities that officially belong to Rhine-Ruhr area. Demographically, these municipalities include 20 cities each with more than 100,000 inhabitants, and 11 districts, each with a population of more than 250,000 inhabitants. Some districts only belong partly to Rhine-Ruhr area. In such a case only the municipalities that belong to the metro area are listed.

See also

 History of the Ruhr
 List of metropolitan areas in Europe by population
 List of metropolitan areas in Germany
 Ruhr Valley

References

Further reading

External links

 Megacities, University of Cologne
 Die Zukunft gehört der Metropolregion Rhein-Ruhr, Düsseldorf Regional Government
 Rhein-Ruhr, Europäische Metropolregionen in Deutschland
 Metropolregion Rhein-Ruhr - ein Kunstprodukt, Bundesamt für Bauwesen und Raumordnung (BBR)

Metropolitan areas of Germany
Regions of North Rhine-Westphalia